Temple Emanuel is a synagogue located in Kensington, Maryland. Temple Emanuel facilitates worship in accordance with Reform Judaism.

Clergy and leadership
Rabbi Adam Rosenwasser provides spiritual leadership at Temple Emanuel. Lindsay Kanter serves as Cantor.

Dianne Neiman is the executive director. Monte Mallin is the president of the board of trustees.

Religious programs and activities
Temple Emanuel Shabbat services and Jewish holiday services.

Temple Emanuel holds brit milah and baby naming ceremonies for newborns, b'nai mitzvah ceremonies for students, marriage ceremonies and blessings, and funeral services.

Temple Emanuel operates an after-school program with a religious curriculum. Temple Emanuel's Early Childhood Center (TEECC) for children ages two to five opened in fall 2008. There are also youth groups for children and teenagers.

As part of its adult learning program, Temple Emanuel has workshops and classes about spiritualism and Judaism. Discussion topics have included Black-Jewish relations, Israeli literature, coping with the rise of anti-semitism in 21st-century Europe; Martin Luther King Jr. and social justice; the lack of access to affordable medical care and Jewish teachings related to the issue; Jewish mysticism and Kabbalah; and a Jewish perspective on equal rights for gays and lesbians.

Temple Emanuel hosted an ecumenical Seder dinner for Jewish and non-Jewish people at Temple Emanuel. Cosponsored by the Friedrich Naumann Foundation and the Friedrich Ebert Foundation, clergy of different religious denominations read poems about Passover in Hebrew, Yiddish, Aramaic, and English.

Performing arts
Temple Emanuel has hosted musical performances such as Russian, Georgian, and Romani songs by musicians of the former Soviet Union; chamber music composed by victims of the Holocaust; and klezmer music inspired by the life and work of the founder of Hasidic Judaism, Baal Shem Tov.

In February 2000, Temple Emanuel's Shabbat service included a dance interpretation of the week's Torah portion, performed by Avodah Dance Ensemble. In December 2003, Temple Emanuel's Shabbat service included jazz music.

Charitable activities
In 1995, forty members of Temple Emanuel cooked and served turkeys to people who were homeless as part of an ecumenical Christmas dinner with So Others Might Eat.

In October 2007, members of Temple Emanuel collected and donated 5,742 pounds of groceries to local food banks.

Historic Torah
In 1917, a Jewish congregation in Slonim, Russia, buried two Torahs in wooden chests in a field to protect them from the Bolsheviks, who had been closing synagogues and burning Torahs throughout the Soviet Union. The Torahs remained there when, on June 25, 1941, Nazi soldiers marched Slonim's Jewish residents to the same field and murdered them there.

The descendants of Slonim's rabbi returned to Slonim and retrieved the two buried Torahs in the 1990s.

Temple Emanuel bought one of the Torahs in 1998.

Activism

Vietnam War
In 1971, Temple Emanuel released a resolution calling for President Richard Nixon to "set and announce a complete withdrawal of all American forces operating in and over Vietnam, Laos and Cambodia by March 1972". The resolution urged Congress to act to end the war if the president did not do so. In a vote among Temple Emanuel's members, 76 percent supported the proposed resolution.

Natan Sharansky
In March 1977, the Soviet Union arrested Natan Sharansky for being a spy for the Central Intelligence Agency. The Soviet Union accused Sharansky of giving the Central Intelligence Agency lists of over 1,300 refuseniks, many of whom were denied exit visas because of their knowledge of state secrets.

Representatives of Temple Emanuel met with the head of the Department of State's Human Rights Office to urged the Department of State to pressure the Soviet Union to release Sharansky.

Sharansky was imprisoned until February 1986, when he and three other accused spies were released to West Germany in exchange for five other individuals also accused of spying. Sharansky immigrated to Israel.

Sustainability
Temple Emanuel has a zero-carbon footprint by supporting the alternative energy investments of the Carbonfund.org Foundation.

Temple Emanuel's sanctuary features a large wood sculpture in the shape of a banyan tree. The sculpture was made from Maryland tulip poplar trees. The sculpture symbolizes one of Temple Emanuel's guiding beliefs, to blend Judaism and sustainability.

In 1994, Temple Emanuel completed an energy audit of its building. Temple Emanuel recycles and composts, and it includes an environmental reading into Shabbat services. The lighting, heating, cooling, and energy efficiency is monitored in every room of the building. Children maintain an organic garden on the grounds. Rabbi Stone strongly supports the congregation's efforts to be sustainable, citing a passage in the Midrash.

The Religious Action Center of Reform Judaism awarded 2013 Irving J. Fain Social Action Award to Temple Emanuel for its activities in support of social justice and tikkun olam.

Genocide in Darfur
In 2005, Temple Emanuel was one of many Jewish congregations organizations that demanded the United States act to end the genocide occurring in Darfur, Sudan.

Marriage equality
In 2012, Temple Emanuel encouraged its members to support the Civil Marriage Protection Act, to allow people of the same sex to marry in Maryland.

Minimum wage
In 2014, Temple Emanuel's membership voted in favor of a resolution supporting an increase in the minimum wage so workers can "support themselves with greater dignity and independence — a true Jewish value. ... It is a religious responsibility to care for the needy of our society and safeguard a just minimum wage."

History

Origins
Temple Emanuel was formally incorporated on December 2, 1952. At the time, it was the only reform Jewish congregation in Montgomery County, Maryland. Rabbi Leon M. Adler served as its first spiritual leader. In January 1955, the congregation agreed to purchase  of land along Connecticut Avenue in Kensington to build a sanctuary, religious school, and social hall. Oscar Felker chaired the fundraising campaign for purchasing the land and constructing the synagogue. Construction plans were finalized in October 1956. Construction was completed in 1958, and the synagogue was formally dedicated on May 2, 1958.

New rabbi
On February 27, 1988, Rabbi Adler died of an aneurysm. Rabbi Warren G. Stone was installed as Temple Emanuel's spiritual leader on November 15, 1988. Originally from Massachusetts, Rabbi Stone had served as rabbi of Stephen S Wise Temple in Los Angeles and Temple Beth El in Corpus Christi, Texas, for six years. In recent years, Rabbi Stone retired.  On July 1, 2020 Rabbi Adam Rosenwasser was installed as Senior Rabbi.

References

External links
 
 

1952 establishments in Maryland
Kensington, Maryland
Reform synagogues in Maryland
Synagogues in Montgomery County, Maryland